Moʻungaʻone is an island in Lifuka district, in the Haʻapai islands of Tonga.

See also 
 List of cities in Tonga

References 

Islands of Tonga
Haʻapai